Yana Uqhu (Quechua yana black, uqhu swamp, "black swamp", Hispanicized spelling Yanaocco) is a mountain in the Andes of Peru, about  high. It is located in the Lima Region, Huaral Province, Pacaraos District, and in the Huaura Province, Santa Leonor District.

References

Mountains of Peru
Mountains of Lima Region